USA-USSR Dual Track Meet Series was a track and field meeting between United States and Soviet Union. It was held 19 times during the Cold War era from 1958 to 1985. The meeting was arranged alternatively in both countries, exception being the last event in 1985 which was held in Tokyo, Japan. Seven indoor meetings were also competed in the 1970s. Although the meetings were foremost athletic competitions, they served as propaganda and foreign diplomacy tools as well.

The most classic meeting is considered the 1962 competition in Stanford, California, with an attendance of more than 150,000 on a two-day event, the largest ever on a non-Olympic track and field competition. Even the Soviet workouts attracted crowds of 5,000. Two world records were set in Stanford, Valeriy Brumel on high jump and Hal Connolly on hammer throw. Though the Stanford meeting was held just two months before the Cuban Missile Crisis, the athletes exhibited mutual friendship, with both Soviet and American athletes congratulating Brumel on his feat and both nations' athletes completing a lap of honour at the end of competition.

Editions

Indoor meetings

World records

Multiple winners

References 

Turrini, Joseph M.: "“It Was Communism Versus the Free World”: The USA-USSR Dual Track Meet Series and the Development of Track and Field in the United states, 1958–1985" Journal of Sports History. Volume 28, Number 3, 2001.

 
Defunct athletics competitions
Indoor track and field competitions
Politics and sports
Recurring sporting events established in 1958
Recurring events disestablished in 1985
Soviet Union–United States relations
International track and field competitions hosted by the United States
International athletics competitions hosted by the Soviet Union